Pleurotus novae-zelandiae is a species of fungus in the genus Pleurotus first described by Miles Joseph Berkeley in 1855, endemic to New Zealand.

Description

General 
 The cap is hygrophanous, subgelatinous, white, fan-shaped, reniform, 6–8 cm. broad, 3–4 cm. long;
 The stem is obsolete but the mushroom is attached by a narrowed base which forms a little round disc,
 The gills are broad, distant, thin, interstices veiny.

Neither Greta Stevenson (1964) nor Egon Horak (1971) could trace material of P. novae-zelandiae, and according to  its description by Berkeley from 1855 would indicate it to be a species of Marasmiellus or Resupinatus. Nevertheless, it is still an accepted species.

Distribution, habitat & ecology 
This mushroom is saprobic on dead wood, present on North Island, of New Zealand.

References 

Pleurotaceae
Fungi of New Zealand
Fungi described in 1855